Søren or Sören is a Scandinavian given name that is sometimes Anglicized as Soren. The name is derived from that of the 4th-century Christian saint Severin of Cologne, ultimately derived from the Latin severus ("severe, strict, serious"). Its feminine form is Sørine, though its use is uncommon. The patronymic surname Sørensen is derived from Søren.

List of people with the given name Søren
Soren Sorensen Adams (1879–1963), American inventor 
Søren Berg (born 1976), Danish football player
Søren "Bjergsen" Bjerg (born 1996), Danish League of Legends player
Søren Brorsen (1875–1961), Danish politician 
Søren Gade (born 1963), Danish politician
Sören Johansson (born 1954), Swedish ice hockey player
Soren Johnson, American game designer
Søren Kierkegaard (1813–1855), Danish philosopher
Søren Larsen (born 1981), Danish football player 
Søren Absalon Larsen (1871–1957), Danish scientist
Søren Lerby (born 1958), Danish football player
Søren Norby (died around 1530), Danish Grand Admiral
Søren Olesen (1891–1973), Danish teacher and politician
Søren Pilmark (born 1955), Danish actor
Søren Egge Rasmussen (born 1961), Danish politician
Søren Rasted (born 1969), Danish musician
Søren L. Sørensen (1897–1965), Danish gymnast
Søren P. L. Sørensen (1868–1939), Danish biochemist
Soren Thompson (born 1981), American épée fencer
Sören Wibe (1946–2010), Swedish politician

Fictional characters
Soren, fictional character in the 2003 film The Matrix Reloaded
Soren, fictional mage in the 2005 video game Fire Emblem: Path of Radiance
Soren (Guardians of Ga'Hoole), fictional character in the Guardians of Ga'Hoole books by Kathryn Lasky
Soren Lorenson, fictional character in the Charlie and Lola books by Lauren Child.
Soren (Underworld), fictional character in the Underworld series of books and films
 Soren, fictional character in the 2004 film The Prince and Me
 Soren the Architect, fictional character on Minecraft: Story Mode
 Soarin, a fictional pony character in the children's television series My Little Pony: Friendship is Magic.
 Soren, a fictional character in original Netflix series The Dragon Prince
 Soren, a fictional character of the androgynous J'Naii species in Star Trek: The Next Generation; episode 17 of the fifth season.
 Soren, a fictional boss in AFK Arena
 Søren, fictional character in the original sinners books by Tiffany Reisz

See also
 Sørensen
 Soren (disambiguation)
 Suren (disambiguation), Persian name also rendered as Soren
 Severin (given name)
 Severus (disambiguation)

References

Danish masculine given names